Draft, The Draft,  or Draught may refer to:

Watercraft dimensions
 Draft (hull), the distance from waterline to keel of a vessel
 Draft (sail), degree of curvature in a sail
 Air draft, distance from waterline to the highest point on a vessel

Selection processes
 Draft (politics), groundswell of support to compel a candidate to run for office
 Draft (sports), selection of players for professional sports teams
 Conscription, selection for e.g. military service

Entertainment
 Draft (musician) (born 1986), Electronic musician and DJ
 Drafted (comics), a 2007 comic released by Devil's Due Publishing
 The Draft (comics), a 1988 one-shot comic book from Marvel Comics
 The Draft (band), an American punk rock band
 Draft 7.30, a 2003 album by British electronic band Autechre
 WWE draft, a World Wrestling Entertainment program which drafts superstars to different WWE brands
 Draughts,  board game, a.k.a. checkers
 The Draft (The League), the series premiere of the FX (TV channel) television series The League
 Draft (magazine), an American magazine about beer and beer culture

Heating, cooling, air flow
 Draft (boiler), difference between atmospheric pressure and the boiler pressure
 Chimney draught, outgoing flow into chimney of gases from combustion
 Draught excluder, used to eliminate cold draught and slow heat loss
 Mechanical draft, incoming flow of air to burn fuel for a boiler or engine
 Vertical draft, vertical movement of air, which can be dangerous to airplanes

Finance
 Demand draft, a check created by a merchant with a buyer's account number on it, but without the buyer's signature
 Banker's draft, a form of check where the funds are taken directly from the financial institution
 Sight draft, or time draft, an order for the payment of money by a banker

Other uses
 Draught beer or other beverage, served from a bulk keg or cask rather than a bottle or can
 Draft (engineering), the angle added to features perpendicular to the parting line of a casting or molding
 Draft (aerodynamics), two objects in close proximity reducing overall drag
 Draft document, a version of an unfinished document or other written work
 Draft animal, an animal used to perform tasks
 Draft horse, a large horse bred to be a working animal doing hard tasks such as plowing and other farm labor
 Draught dog, a variety of working dog used to pull a cart
 Draft (water)
 Draught, an alternate term for a stream

See also 

 Drapht (born 1982), Australian hip hop singer
 Drafting (disambiguation)
 Drought (disambiguation)
 Draft lottery (disambiguation)
 Final Draft (disambiguation)
 
 
 
 
 Checkers (disambiguation), including chequers
 Checker (disambiguation), including chequer
 Check (disambiguation), including cheque